Slava Grigoryan (born 1976) is an Australian classical guitarist and recording artist. He frequently collaborates and performs with his younger brother, fellow guitarist Leonard Grigoryan, performing as the Grigoryan Brothers.

Early life
He was born in Kazakhstan to Eduard and Irina Grigoryan, both professional violinists. His family emigrated to Australia in 1981 and he was raised in Melbourne. Grigoryan began to study guitar with his father at the age of seven. By the age of twelve, he was performing professionally and made his solo debut in Sydney at fourteen. He attended Caulfield Junior College (then known as Caulfield North Central School) and St Michael's Grammar School, during which time he studied with Ron Payne, and, later, at the Victorian College of the Arts.

Career
Following his win at the Tokyo International Classical Guitar Competition, where he was the youngest finalist in the history of that competition, Grigoryan signed with Sony Music Entertainment in 1995 for whom he released four solo albums. Since then he has toured extensively in Australia, Europe, North America and Asia; he made his New York City debut in 1997.

He changed labels to ABC Classics in 2001 and subsequently released another solo album and an album recorded with his younger brother, Leonard. Frequent collaborators, the pair perform as Grigoryan Brothers and have released five albums, all of which have been nominated for ARIA Awards. In 2014  Grigoryan Brothers released This Time which has been well reviewed. Some of their previous releases include The Seasons and Distance.

Grigoryan also joined with fellow Australian musicians Anthony Field, Karin Schaupp and Gareth Koch to release albums under the group name Saffire. Field was later replaced by Leonard (see  Saffire article).

He has been artistic director of the Adelaide Guitar Festival since 2010.

Personal life
Grigoryan has two children Isabella and Paolo from his first marriage. He married cellist Sharon Draper in December 2016 and their son Sebastian was born in July 2018.

Discography

Awards and recognition

In addition to his achievement in the Tokyo International Classical Guitar Competition, he has won a number of awards including Young Australian of the Year for the Arts in 1998, the Mo award for Instrumentalist of the Year in 2001.

In 2000 he appeared as a soloist with the Australian Chamber Orchestra and was part of the 2000 Sydney Olympics Arts Festival.

AIR Awards
The Australian Independent Record Awards (commonly known informally as AIR Awards) is an annual awards night to recognise, promote and celebrate the success of Australia's Independent Music sector.

|-
| AIR Awards of 2017
| Bach Cello Suites Vol 1
| Best Independent Classical Album
| 
|-
| AIR Awards of 2018
|Bach: Cello Suites Volume II 
| Best Independent Classical Album
| 
|-
| AIR Awards of 2019
| Bach Concertos 
| Best Independent Classical Album
| 
|-
| AIR Awards of 2022
| This Is Us: A Musical Reflection of Australia 
| Best Independent Classical Album or EP
| 
|-

ARIA Awards 
The ARIA Music Awards are presented annually from 1987 by the Australian Recording Industry Association (ARIA). Slava Grigoryan won his first ARIA Music Award for Sonatas & Fantasies in 2002. In total, he has won four.

|-
|| 1995 || Spirit of Spain || Best Classical Album ||  
|-
|| 1998 || Dance of the Angels || Best Classical Album ||  
|-
|| 2002 || Sonatas & Fantasies || Best Classical Album ||  
|-
| |2003 || Play (Slava Grigoryan and Leonard Grigoryan) || Best Classical Album ||  
|-
|| 2004 || Brazil (Slava Grigoryan and Jane Rutter) || Best World Music Album ||  
|-
|| 2005 || Afterimage || Best Classical Album ||  
|-
|| 2006 || Rodrigo Guitar Concertos  (Slava Grigoryan, Leonard Grigoryan, Queensland Orchestra, Brett Kelly) || Best Classical Album ||  
|-
||  2007 || Impressions (Slava Grigoryan and Leonard Grigoryan) || Best Classical Album || 
|-
|| 2008 || Baroque Guitar Concertos  (Slava Grigoryan, Tasmanian Symphony Orchestra, Benjamin Northey) || Best Classical Album ||  
|-
| |2009 || Distance (Slava Grigoryan and Leonard Grigoryan) || Best Classical Album ||  
|-
|| 2011 || Band of Brothers (Slava Grigoryan, Leonard Grigoryan, Joseph Tawadros, James Tawadros) || Best World Music Album ||  
|-
|| 2012 || My Latin Heart (Jose Carbo with Slava Grigoryan and Leonard Grigoryan) || Best Classical Album ||  
|-
|| 2015 || This Time (Grigoryan Brothers) || Best Classical Album ||  
|-
| rowspan="3"|2017 || Bach: Cello Suites Volume I || Best Classical Album || 
|-
|| Songs Without Words (Grigoryan Brothers) || Best Classical Album ||  
|-
||Ali's Wedding (soundtrack) (Nigel Westlake & Sydney Symphony Orchestra, with Joseph Tawadros, Slava Grigoryan & Lior) || Best Original Soundtrack or Musical Theatre Cast Album ||  
|-
|| 2018 || Bach: Cello Suites Volume II || Best Classical Album ||  
|-
|| 2019 || Bach Concertos (Grigoryan Brothers, Adelaide Symphony Orchestra & Benjamin Northey) || Best Classical Album ||  
|-
| rowspan="2"| 2020
| Our Place: Duets for Cello and Guitar
|  Best Classical Album
| 
|-
| A Boy Called Sailboat (Grigoryan Brothers)
| Best Original Soundtrack or Musical Theatre Cast Album
| 
|-
|| 2021 || This Is Us (A Musical Reflection of Australia) (Grigoryan Brothers) || Best Classical Album || 
|-

Mo Awards
The Australian Entertainment Mo Awards (commonly known informally as the Mo Awards), were annual Australian entertainment industry awards. They recognise achievements in live entertainment in Australia from 1975 to 2016. Slava Grigoryan won two awards in that time.
 (wins only)
|-
| 2000
| Slava Grigoryan
| Instrumental Performer of the Year
| 
|-
| 2004
| Slava Grigoryan
| Instrumental Performer of the Year
| 
|-

South Australian Music Awards
The South Australian Music Awards (previously known as the Fowler's Live Music Awards) are annual awards that exist to recognise, promote and celebrate excellence in the South Australian contemporary music industry. They commenced in 2012.
 
|-
| 2019
| Slava and Leonard Grigoryan with Beijing Duo
| Best International Collaboration
| 
|-

References

External links
The Grigoryan Brothers, Slava and Leonard's Website

1976 births
ARIA Award winners
Australian classical guitarists
Australian people of Armenian descent
Kazakhstani people of Armenian descent
Living people
Musicians from Melbourne
People educated at St Michael's Grammar School
Australian male guitarists
20th-century Australian musicians
20th-century classical musicians
20th-century guitarists
21st-century Australian musicians
21st-century classical musicians
21st-century guitarists
20th-century Australian male musicians
21st-century Australian male musicians
Victorian College of the Arts alumni
Soviet emigrants to Australia